Douglas Scott Harkness,  (March 29, 1903 – May 2, 1999) was a Canadian politician.

Early life and military service
He was born in Toronto, Ontario, and moved to Calgary, Alberta in 1929. He graduated from the University of Alberta, then farmed and taught school in the vicinity of Red Deer. He taught at Crescent Heights High School until 1939.

He fought during the Second World War from 1940 to 1945, serving in the European theater of war. He was posted to Great Britain, Sicily, Italy and Northwest Europe. In 1943 was awarded the George Medal "in recognition of conspicuous gallantry in carrying out hazardous work in a very brave manner". Harkness was aboard a troopship when it was torpedoed transiting from Sicily to England. Harkness was awarded the medal for his organization of the abandonment of the ship. In 1945, Harkness was the commanding officer of the 5th Anti-Tank Regiment of the 4th Armoured Division. After returning from the war, Harkness returned to farming, residing in De Winton, Alberta, south of Calgary.

Member of Parliament
In 1945, Harkness was elected to the House of Commons of Canada for the constituency of Calgary East and briefly held the Cabinet positions of Minister of Northern Affairs and Minister of National Revenue under the government of John Diefenbaker. He was sworn into the Queen's Privy Council for Canada on August 7, 1957, as Minister of Agriculture.

Harkness was appointed Minister of National Defence, being sworn in on October 11, 1960. He precipitated a political crisis when he resigned from cabinet in February 1963 to protest Diefenbaker's opposition to stationing American nuclear warheads in Canada. The resignation precipitated a split in the cabinet and contributed to the defeat of the government in the 1963 federal election. He continued to sit as a Member of Parliament until 1972.

Post-political career
He lived in Calgary until his death in 1999. In 1978 he was made an Officer of the Order of Canada. The Douglas Harkness Community School in Calgary is named in his honour.

Parliamentary functions

 Minister of Agriculture (Acting), (June 21 – August 6, 1957)
 Minister of Northern Affairs and National Resources, (June 21 – August 18, 1957)
 Minister of Agriculture, (August 7, 1957 – October 10, 1960)
 Minister of National Defence, (October 11, 1960 – February 3, 1963)

Archives 
There is a Douglas Scott Harkness fonds at Library and Archives Canada.

References

External links
 
 Douglas Scott Harkness at The Canadian Encyclopedia

1903 births
1999 deaths
Canadian farmers
Canadian Army personnel of World War II
Military personnel from Toronto
Canadian Presbyterians
Members of the House of Commons of Canada from Alberta
Members of the King's Privy Council for Canada
Defence ministers of Canada
Officers of the Order of Canada
Politicians from Calgary
Politicians from Toronto
Progressive Conservative Party of Canada MPs
Recipients of the George Medal
Royal Regiment of Canadian Artillery officers